Narasimhan (c. 1936  - 12 March 2009), popularly known as Omakuchi, was an Indian stage and film actor. He acted in over 1,500 films in 14 Indian languages, predominantly in Tamil.

Early life 

Born in Kumbakonam in 1936, Narasimhan made his debut in the 1949 movie "Avvaiyar." However, following his debut, Narasimhan did not act in any film until 1980 in order to concentrate on studies.

Family 
He is married to Saraswathi, and they have 3 daughters named Vijayalakshmi, Nirmala and Sangeetha and a son named Omkareshwara.

Career 

On completion of his graduation, Narasimhan worked for the Life Insurance Corporation of India (LIC) for some time before re-entering the Tamil movie industry with "Gauri Kalyanam." He got the support of legendary actor Suruli Rajan, director Visu, during his early part of his career. Since then, Narasimhan acted in over 1,500 films in 14 languages, including an English film ‘Indian Summer’ for which he went to the U.S. His last film was "Thalainagaram," in which Sunder C plays the hero. He was ailing for sometime. He played a vital role in guiding the famous director Shankar in his early stage who he met during their stint in Thillairajan's drama troupe. He got his Omakuchi name from a character he played in the same troupe.

Death 

Narasimhan died on 12 March 2009 at the age of 73. Died due to throat cancer.

Partial filmography

References 

1936 births
2009 deaths
Tamil comedians
20th-century comedians

ta:ஓமக்குச்சி நரசிம்மன்